George Browning (12 December 1858 – 9 October 1900) was an Australian cricketer. He played three first-class cricket matches for Victoria between 1884 and 1885.

See also
 List of Victoria first-class cricketers

References

External links
 

1858 births
1900 deaths
Australian cricketers
Victoria cricketers